Gentry Creek is located in Kimble County a half mile south of the Menard-Kimble county line. It is two miles south of Teacup Mountain and four miles northeast of Junction, Texas. This area is prominently ranchland with deer blinds set up as far as the eye can see. It is classified as a stream and is named after a gentleman named Raleigh Gentry who moved from a place called Bear Creek to just above the mouth of Gentry Creek in 1862. During this time the creek was flowing year round and inhabited by beaver. Today, the small creek has dwindled to almost nothing because of the dry heat the Texas sun can bring. Indians were prevalent in this part of the country for over a thousand years. One of the largest Indian artifact finds in the Texas was on Gentry Creek, and it has been said that some of the brightest stars can be seen from Gentry Creek.

See also
List of rivers of Texas

External links
http://www.gentrycreekranch.com/
http://texas.hometownlocator.com/maps/feature-map,ftc,1,fid,1357944,n,gentry%20creek.cfm

Rivers of Kimble County, Texas
Rivers of Texas